The following is a list of notable deaths in February 1993.

Entries for each day are listed alphabetically by surname. A typical entry lists information in the following sequence:
 Name, age, country of citizenship at birth, subsequent country of citizenship (if applicable), reason for notability, cause of death (if known), and reference.

February 1993

1
Michael Blundell, 85, Kenyan farmer and politician.
José Bravo, 76, Spanish football player.
Mehrab Shahrokhi, 48, Iranian football player.
Gregg G. Tallas, 84, Film director and film editor.
Sven Thofelt, 88, Swedish Olympic pentathlete (1928, 1936, 1948) and fencer.
Harold Edward Winch, 85, Canadian politician.

2
Gino Bechi, 79, Italian operatic baritone.
Bernard Braden, 76, Canadian-British actor and comedian, stroke.
Emilio Bulgarelli, 75, Italian Olympic water polo player (1948).
Clemente Fracassi, 75, Italian film producer, director and screenwriter.
Michael Klein, 33, Romanian football player, heart attack.
Lenny Levy, 79, American baseball player, coach and scout.
Reid Miles, 65, American graphic designer and photographer.
Harry Nilsson, 77, Swedish football defender.
Bernard Peters, 82-83, Polish-German nuclear physicist.
François Reichenbach, 71, French film director, producer and screenwriter.
Alexander Schneider, 84, Lithuanian-American violinist, heart failure.

3
Viktor Ajbek, 72, Croatian footballer.
Françoys Bernier, 65, Canadian musician.
Rosetta Calavetta, 78, Italian actress and voice dubber.
Omar Cañas, 23, Colombian footballer, shot.
Gianni Colombo, 56, Italian artist.
Paul Emery, 76, English racing driver.
Edith Elizabeth Farkas, 71, Hungarian-New Zealand antarctic researcher and meteorologist, bone cancer.
Karel Goeyvaerts, 69, Belgian composer.
Éliane de Meuse, 93, Belgian painter.
Tan Shaowen, 63, Chinese politician, lung cancer.

4
Eldon Jenne, 93, American track and field athlete.
Daulat Singh Kothari, 86, Indian scientist and educationist.
Joaquín Oliva, 66, Spanish football player.
Connie Saylor, 52, American NASCAR racecar driver, cancer.

5
T. W. Alley, 50, American football player and coach, heart attack.
Sidney Bernstein, Baron Bernstein, 94, British businessman and media executive.
William Pène du Bois, 76, American writer and book illustrator, stroke.
Seán Flanagan, 71, Irish Fianna Fáil politician.
Baharul Islam, 74, Indian politician, MP (1962–1972, 1983–1989).
Hans Jonas, 89, German-American philosopher.
Adnan Kahveci, 43, Turkish politician, traffic collision.
Roxanne Kernohan, 32, Canadian actress, traffic collision.
Marcel Léger, 62, Canadian politician, MNA (1970–1985).
Joseph L. Mankiewicz, 83, American film director and screenwriter (All About Eve, A Letter to Three Wives), heart attack.
Tip Tipping, 34, English stuntman (Batman, Willow) and actor (Aliens), parachuting accident.
Jack Young, 80, English cricketer.
Huang Zhizhen, 72, Chinese politician.

6
Arthur Ashe, 49, American tennis player, AIDS.
George Bellew, 93, British officer of arms.
Ruggero Biancani, 78, Italian athlete and Olympian.
Mohammad Natsir, 84, Indonesian islamic scholar and prime minister.
Ion Negoițescu, 71, Romanian writer and historian.

7
Shovkat Alakbarova, 70, Azerbaijani singer.
Frank Balistrieri, 74, American mobster belonging to the Milwaukee crime family.
Duilio Brignetti, 66, Italian Olympic pentathlete (1948, 1952).
William Hayman, 89, English Anglican prelate, Archdeacon of Lewisham (1960–1972).
Erling Dekke Næss, 91, Norwegian shipowner and businessman.
Buddy Pepper, 70, American pianist and songwriter.
Mohsen Sarhan, 79, Egyptian actor.

8
Teddy Glover, 90, English-American football player.
Oto Grigalka, 67, Latvian track and field athlete and Olympian.
William Ewing Hester, 80, American tennis player and official.
Douglas Heyes, 73, American screenwriter, heart attack.
Eliot Janeway, 80, American economist.
Anthony Kramreither, 66, Australian-Canadian film producer.
Charles R. Lord, 61, American intelligence official, Deputy Director of the National Security Agency (1986–1988).
Roland Mousnier, 85, French historian.
Franz Schnyder, 82, Swiss film director.
Nagalingam Shanmugathasan, 72, Sri Lankan trade unionist.
Bram van der Stok, 77, Dutch fighter pilot and flying ace during World War II.

9
Marian Filc, 44, Slovakian Olympic figure skater (1968), heart attack.
Bill Grundy, 69, English journalist and broadcaster, heart attack.
Saburo Okita, 78, Japanese politician and economist.
Elwood Richard Quesada, 88, American lieutenant general and businessman.
Mingun Sayadaw, 81, Burmese theravada Buddhist monk.
Kate Wilkinson, 76, American actress, bone cancer.

10
Elmer Barbour, 74, American gridiron football player.
James C. H. Bonbright, 90, American diplomat and ambassador.
Maurice Bourgès-Maunoury, 78, French politician, prime minister (1957).
William E. Cleator, Sr., 65, American politician, cancer.
Bengt Edlén, 86, Swedish astronomer and academic.
Fred Hollows, 63, New Zealand-Australian ophthalmologist, renal cancer.
Gaya Prasad Katiyar, 92, Indian revolutionary.
Mickey Murtagh, 88, American football player.
Rip Repulski, 64, American baseball player.

11
Kamal Amrohi, 75, Indian film director and screenwriter.
Charles Eric Dawson, 70, Canadian ichthyologist.
Joy Garrett, 47, American actress, liver failure.
Robert W. Holley, 71, American biochemist, Nobel Prize recipient (1968), lung cancer.
Brian Inglis, 76, Irish journalist, historian and television presenter.
Oksana Kostina, 20, Russian rhythmic gymnast, traffic collision.
Desanka Maksimović, 94, Serbian poet and writer.
Félix Ruiz, 52, Spanish footballer.
Newton Steers, 76, American politician.

12
Joe Booher, 51, American racing driver, racing accident.
James Bulger, 2, English murder victim.
Mark W. Ellingson, 88, American academic, president of the Rochester Institute of Technology (1936–1969).
Thelma G. Thurstone, 95, American psychologist and psychological testing pioneer.

13
Araxie Babayan, 86, Soviet and Armenian organic chemist.
G. H. Diggle, 90, English chess player.
Henry Duey, 84, American weightlifter and Olympic medalist.
Willoughby Gray, 76, English actor of stage and screen, cancer.

14
Elek Bacsik, 66, Hungarian-American jazz guitarist and violinist.
Eleazar Lipsky, 81, American lawyer, writer and playwright, leukemia.
Eric Lionel Mascall, 87, English Anglican priest and theologian.
Pedro Cortina y Mauri, 84, Spanish politician and diplomat.
Veljko Milanković, 38, Bosnian Serb military commander, killed in battle.
Terry Reardon, 73, Canadian ice hockey player and coach.
Lester Wilson, 50, American dancer, choreographer, and actor, heart attack.

15
Kay Eakin, 75, American gridiron football player.
Cary Gilbert, 50, American lyricist ("Me and Mrs. Jones"), diabetes.
Marie-Louise Linssen-Vaessen, 64, Dutch freestyle swimmer and Olympic medalist.
George Wallington, 68, American jazz pianist.

16
Leland D. Crawford, 63, United States Marine officer.
Amos Guttman, 38, Israeli film director (Amazing Grace, Drifting), AIDS-related complications.
Peter Molloy, 83, English football player, manager and referee.
Richard S. Salant, 78, American news executive.

17
Hans Baur, 95, German flying ace.
Eşref Bitlis, 59-60, Turkish general, plane crash.
Jack Froggatt, 70, English football player.
Rani Gaidinlu, 78, Indian revolutionary.
Kostas Karagiannis, 60-61, Greek film director.
Sammy Lowe, 74, American trumpeter.
Leslie Townsend, 89, English cricketer.

18
Marshall Carter, 83, American Army Lieutenant general.
Ted Haworth, 75, American production designer (Sayonara, Some Like It Hot, The Longest Day), Oscar winner (1958), cardiovascular disease.
Jacqueline Hill, 63, English actress (Doctor Who), breast cancer.
Rita La Roy, 91, American actress and dancer, pneumonia.
Allen Montgomery Lewis, 83, Saint Lucian barrister and public servant.
Leslie Norman, 81, English film director.
Kerry Von Erich, 33, American professional wrestler (WCCW), suicide by gunshot.

19
Judith Chaplin, 53, British politician, pulmonary embolism.
Alexander Davydov, 80, Soviet and Ukrainian physicist.
Bernard T. Feld, 73, American nuclear physicist and academic.
Gerhard Gesell, 82, American judge.
Mohamed Hamzah, 74, Malaysian vexillographer, architect and field marshal.
Česlovas Kudaba, 58, Lithuanian politician and geographer.
Yusif Mirzayev, 34, Azerbaijani soldier, killed in battle.
Yaman Okay, 42, Turkish actor, pancreatic cancer.

20
Mario Abreu, 73, Venezuelan artist.
Howard Mayer Brown, 62, American musicologist.
Marian Bublewicz, 42, Polish racing driver, racing collision.
Ferruccio Lamborghini, 76, Italian automobile manufacturer (Lamborghini), heart attack.

21
Irma Christenson, 78, Swedish actress.
Alison Fairlie, 75, English scholar.
Harvey Kurtzman, 68, American cartoonist (Mad, Playboy), liver cancer.
Inge Lehmann, 104, Danish seismologist and geophysicist.
Eddy Tiel, 66, Dutch field hockey player and Olympic medalist.
Dick White, 86, British intelligence officer.

22
Pierre Dalem, 80, Belgian football player.
Jean Lecanuet, 72, French politician, cancer.
Bill Lickiss, 68, Australian politician.
Hugo Schrader, 90, German television and film actor.
B. D. Sharma, 75, Indian politician.
Sirio Vernati, 85, Swiss football player.
Feng Zhi, 87, Chinese writer and translator.

23
Helmut Braselmann, 81, German field handball player and Olympic champion.
Walter Fyrst, 91, Norwegian filmmaker.
Mario Pani, 81, Mexican architect and urbanist.
Carl Sautter, 44, American film and television writer (Moonlighting, Lucky Luke, Jetsons: The Movie).
Phillip Terry, 83, American actor, stroke.
Robert Triffin, 81, Belgian economist.

24
Cyril Done, 72, English football player.
Danny Gallivan, 75, Canadian sportscaster, heart failure.
Bobby Moore, 51, English football player and world champion (1966), colorectal cancer.
Chaim L. Pekeris, 84, Israeli-American physicist and mathematician.
Roger Rochard, 79, French long-distance runner and Olympian.
Denis Vaucher, 95, Swiss cross country skier and Olympian.

25
Hashem Amoli, 93, Iranian scholar and ayatollah.
Toy Caldwell, 45, American guitarist (The Marshall Tucker Band), heart attack.
Eddie Constantine, 75, American-French actor and singer, heart attack.
Dave Cook, 51, British communist activist, complications following traffic accident.
Sonja Mjøen, 94, Norwegian actress, journalist and author.
Mary Walter, 80, Filipino actress.
Eren Özker, 44, Turkish-American puppeteer, cancer.

26
John Besford, 82, English swimmer and Olympian.
Constance Ford, 69, American actress (Another World, A Summer Place), cancer.
Fletcher Knebel, 81, American author, suicide by drug overdose.
Beaumont Newhall, 84, American art historian.
Giulio Oggioni, 76, Italian Catholic prelate.
Arthur Maria Rabenalt, 87, Austrian film director, writer, and author.
Carl Solomon, 64, American writer.

27
Pina Carmirelli, 79, Italian violinist.
José Álvarez de Bohórquez, 97, Spanish equestrian and Olympic champion.
Lillian Gish, 99, American actress (The Birth of a Nation, Duel in the Sun, The Whales of August), heart failure.
Ambrose A. Holowach, 78, Canadian businessman and politician.
Steve Levantis, 76, Canadian football player.
Walker Smith, 96, American track and field athlete and Olympian.
Marģeris Zariņš, 82, Latvian composer.
Zhao Zengyi, 72-73, Chinese politician.

28
Franco Brusati, 72, Italian film director (To Forget Venice).
Joyce Carey, 94, English actress.
Ishirō Honda, 81, Japanese film director (Godzilla), respiratory failure.
Toshiaki Inoue, 42, Japanese triple jumper, accident.
Ruby Keeler, 83, American actress and dancer, kidney cancer.
Ilkka Koski, 64, Finnish heavyweight boxer.

References 

1993-02
 02